SVK is an initialism which may refer to:

 Slovakia, IOC and ISO 3166-1 alpha-3 code
 SVK (comics), by Warren Ellis
 SVK (software), co-developed by Audrey Tang
 SVK Systems, a distributor of an RC flight simulator
 SVK Pianotech Ltd of Cyprus, MD Stavros V. Kyriakides
 Former Air Slovakia, ICAO code
 Army of the Republic of Serb Krajina (Srpska Vojska Krajine)
 Seven Kings railway station, London, station code